Berta Hrubá (8 April 1946 in Prague – 24 July 1998) was a Czech field hockey player who competed in the 1980 Summer Olympics.

References

External links
 

1946 births
1998 deaths
Sportspeople from Prague
Czech female field hockey players
Olympic field hockey players of Czechoslovakia
Field hockey players at the 1980 Summer Olympics
Olympic silver medalists for Czechoslovakia
Olympic medalists in field hockey
Medalists at the 1980 Summer Olympics